The Yale Postdoctoral Association (YPA) is an association composed of postdocs from all disciplines working at the Yale University. The goal of this association is to create a sense of community among postdocs, as well as to improve their experience at Yale. It organizes professional development and social events around Yale. There is an average of 1200 postdocs working at Yale, with contract length ranging from 1 to 5 years.

The YPA was created in March 2015. On June 8, 2018, the YPA organized the 1st Postdoc Symposium at Yale, a unique opportunity for postdoc to mingle, network and present their research.

Organization & membership 
The association is supervised by two elected chairs helped by two secretaries. The association is organized in committees lead each by two coordinators. 
The committees are:
 Professional Development
 Community & Networking
 Advocacy
 Mentorship
 Treasury
 Communication

The YPA consider that every postdoc at Yale (postdoctoral associate and postdoctoral fellow) is a member of YPA and can participate in the events. The YPA executive board is composed of volunteering postdocs that want to improve the community.

Events 
 Monthly Happy Hours
 Career Cafés, roundtable.
 Orientation "201" to the Yale University Resources
 Professional Bootcamp (e.g. LinkedIn workshop)
 Visits of New Haven area 
 Last Saturday at the Museum: tour of the Yale University Art Gallery and Yale Center for British Art 
 Advocacy workshop: "Uncouscious Bias", "Bystander Intervention", "Discovering culture through martial arts", etc.
 Reception at the Yale Club in New York City.

References 

Education-related professional associations
University organizations
Postdoctoral research
Yale University